The following lists notable events that occurred during 1979 in Sri Lanka.

Incumbents
 President – J. R. Jayewardene
 Prime Minister – Ranasinghe Premadasa
 Chief Justice – Neville Samarakoon

Events
 Sri Lanka defeated India in the ICC World Cup. They were the winners of the inaugural ICC Trophy, ahead of the cricket World Cup. 
 Ethnic tensions and political unrest increase, as the Tamil minority realize their political party is having minimal success in the south.

Births

 4 January – Chamila Gamage, cricketer.
 27 February – Sanjaya Rodrigo, cricketer.
 28 February – Dinesh Lalinda, cricketer.
 2 March – Dharshana Gamage, cricketer.
 28 March – Duminda Dissanayake, politician.
 30 March – Malaka Dewapriya, film maker.
 2 April – Amila Perera, cricketer.
 13 May – Krishantha Ukwatte, cricketer.
 26 May – Malinda Warnapura, cricketer.
 22 June – Buddhika Mendis, cricketer.
 10 July – Dinesh Subasinghe, musician.
 11 July – Nisitha Rupasinghe, cricketer.
 19 July – Dilhara Fernando, cricketer.
 29 July – Chaminda Ruwan, cricketer.
 10 August – Dinusha Fernando, cricketer.
 14 August – Ranga Dias, cricketer.
 11 September – Thuwan Raheem, footballer.
 28 September – Mahesh Bogahalanda, cricketer.
 6 October – Chanuka Bandara, cricketer.
 7 October – Sujeewa de Silva, cricketer.
 9 October – Prasanna Jayawardene, cricketer.
 14 October – Hasantha Fernando, cricketer.
 26 October – Indika Basnayake, cricketer.
 29 October – Duminda Perera, cricketer.
 2 December – Manju Wanniarachchi, boxer.
 4 December – Wenura Caldera, cricketer.
 14 December – Chamara Silva, cricketer.
 17 December – Upekha Fernando, cricketer.
 31 December – Malinga Bandara, cricketer.

Deaths
 17 February – K. Alvapillai, civil servant (b. 1905).
 23 May – S. Selvanayagam, geographer and academic (b. 1932).
 14 August – N. M. Perera, politician (b. 1905).
 15 September – Don Carlin Gunawardena, academic (b. 1899).
 28 December – Dommie Jayawardena, actor and singer (b. 1927).
 Unknown date – I. J. Wickrema, trade unionist (b. 1922).

References

 
1970s in Sri Lanka
Sri Lanka
Sri Lanka
Years of the 20th century in Sri Lanka